Jonah Andre Hauer-King (born 30 May 1995) is an English actor. He has starred in the films The Last Photograph (2017) and A Dog's Way Home (2019), and appeared in the television miniseries Howards End (2017), Little Women (2017) and World on Fire (2019). In 2020, he was cast as Prince Eric in the Disney film The Little Mermaid (2023).

Early life and education 
Hauer-King was born on 30 May 1995 in Islington, London, the son of Debra Hauer, a Jewish theatre producer and therapist, and Jeremy King, a prominent London restaurateur. His sister is Margot Hauer-King, an accounts manager and partner of actor Josh O'Connor. Hauer-King was raised Jewish. His maternal grandparents were Polish Jews who fled Warsaw in the 1930s.

Hauer-King attended St John's College, Cambridge, where he graduated with a first class degree in theology and religious studies, juggling acting roles on stage and screen whilst he was there.

Career 
Hauer-King's first feature was a lead role in Danny Huston's The Last Photograph, which received its world premiere at the Edinburgh International Film Festival. He played Laurie in the 2017 BBC version of Little Women, and starred as Andrius Aras in the film Ashes in the Snow (2018), opposite Bel Powley, and as David in Postcards from London (2018). He also starred as Lucas in the film A Dog's Way Home (2019). His other roles include The Song of Names and This Is the Night. His most recent feature was playing Harry Chase in BBC World War II drama World on Fire (2019). King also appeared in the television film Agatha and the Curse of Ishtar. On 12 November 2019, it was announced that King would play Prince Eric in the upcoming live-action film adaptation of The Little Mermaid. and as Lev in tv adaption of The Tattooist of Auschwitz

Filmography

Films

Television

References

External links 
 

1995 births
Living people
21st-century American male actors
21st-century English male actors
Alumni of St John's College, Cambridge
American male film actors
American male stage actors
American male television actors
American people of English descent
American people of Polish-Jewish descent
English male film actors
English male stage actors
English male television actors
English people of American descent
English people of Polish-Jewish descent
Male actors from London
People educated at Eton College
People from Westminster